The Javan cochoa (Cochoa azurea) is a species of bird in the family Turdidae. It is endemic to Indonesia.

Its natural habitat is subtropical or tropical moist montane forests. It is threatened by habitat loss.

References

Javan cochoa
Birds of Java
Javan cochoa
Taxonomy articles created by Polbot